Life OK was an Indian pay television channel owned by Star India. It was launched on 18 December 2011 replacing Star One.
It also started airing in the United States on 1 March 2012, and in the United Kingdom and Ireland on 28 May of that same year. It launched its own high-definition feed in October 2012.
On 9 September 2012, Life OK's historical drama Devon Ke Dev...Mahadev recorded an 8.2 TVR,  its highest TRP of 167.
The channel was rebranded as Star Bharat on 28 August 2017.

Programming

References

External links
Life OK on hotstar

Television stations in Mumbai
Television channels and stations established in 2011
Television channels and stations disestablished in 2017
Foreign television channels broadcasting in the United Kingdom
Defunct television channels in India
Former subsidiaries of The Walt Disney Company